(born March 21, 1980) is a Japanese weightlifter.

At the 2006 World Championships he ranked 17th in the 56 kg category, with a total of 246 kg.
At the 2007 World Championships he ranked 14th in the 56 kg category, with a total of 250 kg.

He competed in Weightlifting at the 2008 Summer Olympics in the 56 kg division finishing eleventh, with 256 kg, beating his personal best by 6 kg.

He is 5 ft 1 inches tall and weighs 132 lb.

Notes and references

External links
 NBC profile
 Athlete Biography SEKIKAWA Yasunobu at beijing2008

Japanese male weightlifters
1980 births
Living people
Weightlifters at the 2008 Summer Olympics
Olympic weightlifters of Japan